Four in a Jeep is a 1951 Swiss drama film directed by Leopold Lindtberg and Elizabeth Montagu.

Cast
 Ralph Meeker as Sergeant William Long
 Viveca Lindfors as Franziska Idinger
 Yossi Yadin as Sergeant Vassili Voroshenko (as Yoseph Yodin)
 Michael Medwin as Sergeant Harry Stuart
 Albert Dinan as Sergeant Marcel Pasture
 Paulette Dubost as Germaine Pasture
 Harry Hess as Captain R. Hammon
 Eduard Loibner as Hackl, the apartment manager
 Hans Putz as Karl Idinger
 Geraldine Katt as Steffi, Harry's girl

Awards
Wins
 1st Berlin International Film Festival - Golden Bear (Drama).
 5th British Academy Film Awards - United Nations Award - for the best Film embodying one or more of the principles of the United Nations Charter.

Nominations
 1951 Cannes Film Festival - Palme d'Or.

References

External links

1951 films
English-language Swiss films
1950s English-language films
1950s German-language films
1951 drama films
Swiss black-and-white films
Films directed by Leopold Lindtberg
Golden Bear winners
Films set in Vienna
Swiss drama films